John Berry is the second studio album by the American country music artist of the same name. It was released in June 1993 by Liberty Records. It peaked at #13 on the Top Country Albums chart, and was certified Platinum by the RIAA. Singles released from it include "A Mind of Her Own", "Kiss Me in the Car", "Your Love Amazes Me", "What's In It for Me" and "You and Only You".

Track listing

Personnel
As listed in liner notes.
Greg Barnhill – background vocals
Eddie Bayers – drums
John Berry - lead vocals
John Catchings – cello on "When Love Dies"
Bill Cuomo – keyboards
Dan Dugmore – steel guitar, dobro
John Barlow Jarvis – piano
Chuck Jones – electric guitar, background vocals
Mary Ann Kennedy – background vocals
J.D. Martin – background vocals
Pam Rose – background vocals
Michael Rhodes – bass guitar
Billy Joe Walker, Jr. – acoustic guitar
Biff Watson – acoustic guitar
Willie Weeks – bass guitar
John Willis – electric guitar
Dennis Wilson – background vocals
Curtis Young – background vocals
Reggie Young – electric guitar

Production
Produced By Chuck Howard
Engineers: Bob Campbell-Smith, John Kelton, Dennis Ritchie
Assistant Engineers: Derek Bason, Barry Hall, Mel Jones, Patrick Kelly, David Matthews, Craig White
Mixing: John Kelton
Mix Assistants: Derek Bason, Mel Jones
Digital Editing & Mastering: Glenn Meadows

Charts

Weekly charts

Year-end charts

References

1993 albums
John Berry (country singer) albums
Liberty Records albums